Blanka may refer to:

People
Blanka (given name)
Blanka Stajkow, Polish singer and model

Fictional characters
Blanka, video game character from the Street Fighter series
Queen Cecilia Blanka, fictional queen consort of Sweden invented by Jan Guillou

Infrastructure
Blanka tunnel complex, the longest city tunnel in Europe

See also
Ancema blanka, an Asian butterfly species